Rhinosporidiosis is an infection caused by Rhinosporidium seeberi.

Classification
This organism was previously considered to be a fungus, and rhinosporidiosis is classified as a fungal disease under ICD-10.  It is now considered to be a protist classified under Mesomycetozoea.

Authors of detailed studies have revealed superficial similarities between Dermocystidium and Rhinosporidium when using light microscopy, but substantial morphological differences between the groups exist.

There is some evidence that DNA extracted from purified uncontaminated round bodies (Rhinosporidium seeberi) is of cyanobacterial origin.

Pathophysiology
Rhinosporidiosis is a granulomatous disease affecting the mucous membrane of nasopharynx, oropharynx, conjunctiva, rectum and external genitalia. Though the floor of the nose and inferior turbinate are the most common sites, the lesions may appear elsewhere too. Traumatic inoculation from one site to others is common. Laryngeal rhinosporidiosis, too, has been described and may be due to inoculation from the nose during endotracheal intubation. After inoculation, the organism replicates locally, resulting in hyperplasia of host tissue and localised immune response.
 infection of nose and nasopharynx - 70%
 infection of palpebral conjunctiva - 15%

Diagnosis
 History
 Unilateral nasal obstruction
 Epistaxis
 Local pruritus
 Rhinorrhea
 Coryza (rhinitis) with sneezing
 Post nasal discharge with cough
 Foreign body sensation
 History of exposure to contaminated water
 Increased tearing and photo phobia in cases of infection of palpebral conjunctiva
 On examination
 Pink to deep red polyps
 Strawberry like appearance
 Bleeds easily upon manipulation
 Diagnosis
 confirmed by biopsy and histopathology - several round or oval sporangia and spores which may be seen bursting through its chitinous wall

Treatment
 Surgical excision - wide excision with wide area electro-coagulation of the lesion base
 Medical treatment is not so effective but treatment with a year-long course of dapsone has been reported
 Recurrence is common

Epidemiology
Disease endemic in Chhattisgarh South India, Sri Lanka, South America and Africa. It is presumed to be transmitted by exposure to the pathogen when taking a bath in stagnant water pools where animals also bathe.It is also common in South Asian countries.

References

External links 

Bovine diseases
Cat diseases
Dog diseases
Mycosis-related cutaneous conditions